Mohamed Jah Massaquoi (born November 24, 1986) is a former American football wide receiver. He played college football at Georgia and was drafted by the Cleveland Browns in the second round of the 2009 NFL Draft.

Massaquoi has also been a member of the Jacksonville Jaguars and New York Jets.

Early years
Massaquoi was born in Charlotte, North Carolina to parents from Liberia. He played high-school football at Independence High School in Charlotte. During his four years there his team did not lose a single game and won four straight state championships. He played with two college football notables, former University of Florida quarterback Chris Leak and former University of North Carolina wide receiver Hakeem Nicks.

Career receptions: 274
Career receiving yards: 4,876
Career receiving touchdowns: 76

College career
He finished his collegiate career at the University of Georgia with 158 catches for 2,282 yards and 16 touchdowns, which ranks fourth best in school history. Massaquoi had a strong senior season with career-highs in catches (58), yards (920), and touchdowns (8). In Massaquoi's last four regular-season games at Georgia, he caught 29 passes for 544 yards and 4 touchdowns (including a career-high 3 in Georgia's 45-42 loss to Georgia Tech). His longest reception came in his junior season against SEC East rival Florida, hauling in an 84-yard touchdown pass from quarterback Matthew Stafford.

Professional career

Cleveland Browns

Massaquoi was drafted by the Browns in the second round with the 50th overall pick in the 2009 NFL Draft.

Massaquoi was the Browns leading receiver during his rookie season (2009) with 34 catches for 624 yards, including an NFL best 148 receiving yards (on 8 catches) in Week 4.

In his four years with the Browns, Massaquoi caught a total of 118 passes for 1,745 yards and 7 touchdowns.

Jacksonville Jaguars
Massaquoi was signed by the Jacksonville Jaguars on April 5, 2013 on a two-year deal.

He was released on August 19, 2013.

New York Jets
Massaquoi signed with the New York Jets on August 22, 2013. He was released on August 31, 2013.

Accident
In April 2017, Massaquoi suffered an ATV accident which led to the amputation of four fingers on his left hand.

References

External links

Georgia Bulldogs bio
Cleveland Browns bio

1986 births
Living people
American amputees
American people of Liberian descent
Players of American football from Charlotte, North Carolina
American football wide receivers
Georgia Bulldogs football players
Cleveland Browns players
Jacksonville Jaguars players
New York Jets players